Buffalo Prairie Township is located in Rock Island County, Illinois. As of the 2010 census, its population was 824 and it contained 359 housing units.  Buffalo Prairie Township was originally named Buffalo Township, but changed its name to Copper Township October 1, 1857, and then from Copper to Buffalo Prairie.

Geography

Demographics

References

External links

City-data.com
Illinois State Archives

Townships in Rock Island County, Illinois
Townships in Illinois
1858 establishments in Illinois
Populated places established in 1858